Filip Stoklasa (born 25 December 1990) is a Czech professional ice hockey player. He began his play with HC Pardubice in the Czech Extraliga during the 2008–09 Czech Extraliga season.

References

External links

1990 births
Czech ice hockey forwards
HC Dynamo Pardubice players
Living people
People from Chrudim
Sportspeople from the Pardubice Region
Hokej Šumperk 2003 players
KH Zagłębie Sosnowiec players
MKS Cracovia (ice hockey) players
GKS Katowice (ice hockey) players
TMH Polonia Bytom players
JKH GKS Jastrzębie players
HC Dukla Jihlava players
HC Chrudim players
Czech expatriate sportspeople in Poland
Expatriate ice hockey players in Poland
Czech expatriate ice hockey people